The southeastern xanthurus rat (Rattus salocco), is a rodent of the genus Rattus.

Habitat
This species is known only from the southeastern peninsula of Sulawesi, where it has been found at  altitude. Only three specimens of this poorly understood species are known; the last were collected in 1932 at the mountain Tanke Salokko. The IUCN Red List therefore lists the species as Data Deficient.

Classification
Although R. salocco is usually considered a subspecies or synonym of Rattus xanthurus, R. salocco was recognized as a separate species more closely related to R. marmosurus in the 2005 third edition of Mammal Species of the World.

References

Notes

Rattus
Rodents of Indonesia
Mammals described in 1935